Courtney Goodson may refer to:

 CoCo Goodson (born 1990), American soccer defender
 Courtney Hudson Goodson (born 1973), justice of the Arkansas Supreme Court